Alessandro Ballan (born 6 November 1979 in Castelfranco Veneto, Veneto) is an Italian former professional road bicycle racer who most recently rode for UCI World Tour team . He is best known for winning the World Road Race Championships, in 2008. Although he possessed a frame that was usually more associated with climbing, Ballan established himself as a leading spring classics contender. His nickname, Bontempino, is a diminutive reference to Guido Bontempi, to whom he bears a resemblance.

Career
Ballan turned professional in 2004 with the  team. Despite a decent amateur career, Ballan was not sought after by professional teams, and required a little bit of help to secure a professional contract. In his first season, Ballan worked as a domestique for Romāns Vainšteins and Gianluca Bortolami.

2005

In 2005, Ballan was given the opportunity to aim for high placings in the spring classics and achieved a stage victory and second overall in the Three Days of De Panne, along with sixth place in the Tour of Flanders, having attacked the leading group with 37 km to go. Later in the season, he achieved his first ProTour victory in taking stage 4 of the Eneco Tour of Benelux.

2006

In 2006, Ballan started his spring classics campaign as a highly rated contender, given his performances in 2005 and his success in the warm-up races in winning the Trofeo Laigueglia, a second place to Tom Boonen in the E3 Prijs Vlaanderen and third overall at the Tirreno–Adriatico. Ballan was a leading protagonist in the classics: he took fifth at the Tour of Flanders and followed this with third at Paris–Roubaix, following the disqualifications of Peter Van Petegem, Vladimir Gusev and Leif Hoste. Later in the season, Ballan further proved his talent with a second placing in stage 12 of the Tour de France and a third place overall in the Tour de Pologne. Ballan finished in sixth place in the individual rankings of the 2006 UCI ProTour.

2007

In 2007 Ballan suffered a broken collarbone during Tirreno–Adriatico. Despite this injury, Ballan worked hard in Milan–San Remo, although Ballan's teamleader Daniele Bennati did not win the race. Nearly two weeks later, Ballan won the Three Days of De Panne after an escape during stage 1. Ballan did not win the stage, but beat his nearest opponent Luca Paolini during the closing time trial, in which Ballan finished 10. On 8 April, Ballan took a prestigious win at the Tour of Flanders in a close sprint finish ahead of local favourite Leif Hoste of Belgium. Ballan is the first Italian to win the Tour of Flanders and the Three Days of De Panne in the same season. On 19 August he won the Vattenfall Cyclassics with an attack in the final kilometer, holding off all of the sprinters, including former winner Óscar Freire and promising young German sprinter Gerald Ciolek, to take his second one-day classic of the season.

2008

His spring of 2008 wasn't as prolific as 2007 although he was involved in the decisive break of Paris–Roubaix and rode hard to a third place behind past winners Tom Boonen and Fabian Cancellara together with whom he entered the Roubaix Velodrome losing out in a sprint to the line. This came a week after a fourth place in defence of his Tour of Flanders crown. He again opted to skip his home tour – the Giro d'Italia, but raced in both the other grand tours – the Tour de France and the Vuelta a España, winning a mountain stage and wearing the leader's jersey in the latter.

In September 2008 Ballan won the UCI Road Race World Championships. In a race in which 2007 champion and Italian team mate Paolo Bettini was favourite, Ballan was again involved in the decisive break on the final lap of the undulating Varese circuit. From a group of 12 riders, including 2 Italian team mates Damiano Cunego and Davide Rebellin, Ballan attacked from 1500 metres out and held off the sprint to win by 3 seconds in front of his home crowd.

2009

As if suffering from the curse of the rainbow jersey, Ballan was diagnosed with cytomegalovirus in March 2009 and as a result was unable to contest that year's Spring Classics and Giro. During the Tour de France he had an average performance, only coming into the picture in the 19th stage as part of a breakaway which was caught before the finish line.

In August 2009, he won the Tour of Poland.

2012

At the Tour of Flanders in April, Ballan placed third after initiating a break with 25 km to go. Boonen and Pozzato took up the chase and placed ahead of Ballan in the final sprint. In December, Ballan suffered a severe training crash during a descent as he was riding with his team in Spain. He fractured his left femur, broke a rib and ruptured his spleen, which had to be removed. He spent a little more than a week in intensive care.

Doping sanction
Ballan is one of 27 people indicted in Italy as part of the Mantova doping investigation. In 2010 when the enquiry was announced he was subsequently suspended by the BMC cycling team. He was later cleared by BMC and allowed to race again on 28 May 2010. In November 2013 it was reported that CONI were seeking a 2-year ban for violation of article 2.2 of the WADA code.

In January 2014, CONI handed Ballan a two-year suspension.

Late 2015, his suspension was overturned in court, and Ballan was cleared of any wrongdoing.

In 2016, Ballan had attempted to get a contract as professional cyclist, but was unable to do so and thus retired.

Career achievements

Major results

2005
 1st Stage 1 Three Days of De Panne
 1st Stage 4 Eneco Tour of Benelux
 6th Tour of Flanders
2006
 1st Trofeo Laigueglia
 2nd E3 Prijs Vlaanderen
 3rd Paris–Roubaix
 3rd Overall Tirreno–Adriatico
 5th Tour of Flanders
 8th Milan–San Remo
2007
 1st  Overall Three Days of De Panne
 1st Tour of Flanders
 1st Vattenfall Cyclassics
 4th Clásica de San Sebastián
 5th Overall Tour de Pologne
2008
 1st   Road race, UCI Road World Championships
 1st Stage 7 Vuelta a España
 2nd Monte Paschi Eroica
 3rd Paris–Roubaix
 4th Tour of Flanders
2009
 1st  Overall Tour de Pologne
1st Stage 5
2010
 3rd Road race, National Road Championships
 5th Overall Tour de Pologne
2011
 2nd Montepaschi Strade Bianche
 4th Milan–San Remo
 6th Paris–Roubaix
2012
 1st Giro di Toscana
 1st Stage 7 Eneco Tour
 1st Stage 1 (TTT) Giro del Trentino
 3rd Paris-Roubaix
 3rd Tour of Flanders
 4th Strade Bianche
 8th Milan–San Remo
 9th E3 Harelbeke

Grand Tour general classification results timeline

Classics results timeline

References

External links

Interview Alessandro Ballan (2013)
Team Profile 
Eurosport Profile

1979 births
Living people
People from Castelfranco Veneto
Italian male cyclists
Italian sportspeople in doping cases
Italian Vuelta a España stage winners
UCI Road World Champions (elite men)
Cyclists from the Province of Treviso
Doping cases in cycling